Assam Gramin Vikash Bank is the only regional rural bank of Assam, India. It is under the ownership of Ministry of Finance , Government of India. The bank was formally launched on 12 January 2006 after amalgamation of Pragjyotish Gaonlia Bank, Lakhimi Gaonlia Bank, Cachar Gramin Bank and Subansiri Gaonlia Bank, which were sponsored by erstwhile United Bank of India now Punjab National Bank. As per Government of India directives for forming of state wise Regional Rural Banks Assam Gramin Vikash Bank was further amalgamated with Langpi Dehangi Rural Bank which was sponsored by State Bank of India to form present Assam Gramin Vikash Bank w.e.f 1 April 2019 without changing of the name of the newly formed entity.

Bank structure
The bank has three tier structure consisting of one head office at Guwahati,  nine regional offices and 473 branches. They are: Nalbari, Golaghat, Lakhimpur, Guwahati, Dibrugarh, Kokrajhar, Silchar, Tezpur and Diphu. Among these offices there are 473 branches operation across all 33 districts of Assam through which the bank is serving its customers. The bank is one of the leading banks in the state of Assam.

See also

 Banking in India
 List of banks in India
 Reserve Bank of India
 Regional Rural Bank
 Indian Financial System Code
 List of largest banks
 List of companies of India
 Make in India

References

Regional rural banks of India
Companies based in Assam
2006 establishments in Assam
Banks established in 2006
Indian companies established in 2006
Economy of Guwahati